Antonio Lukic (Ukrainian: Антоніо Лукіч) is a Ukrainian filmmaker who was born in Uzhhorod, Ukraine. Throughout his career, Antonio has achieved much success, gaining awards at an international and nationally recognised level. One such award is the Merited Artist of Ukraine awarded to him in March, 2021. This state honorary decoration is awarded to those who make significant contributions and achieve notable success in film and art for the country of Ukraine.

Biography 
Antonio was born in 1992 in Uzhhorod.

In 2011–2015, he studied at the Karpenko-Kary Kyiv National University and received a bachelor's degree in directing (studying with Volodymyr Oseledchyk).

Antonio Lukic's first film, "Fish of Lake Baikal," released in 2014, won the "Best Documentary Award" at the CineRail International Film Festival in Paris. His graduation film, It was showering in Manchester went on to win Best Short Film at the 2016 Odesa International Film Festival.

In 2019, his debut full-length feature film "My Thoughts Are Silent" was released.

Films

Student films 
Is It Easy to Be Young?, 2011

Hello, Sister!, 2012

Fish of Lake Baikal, 2013

Who Framed Kim Kuzin?, 2014

It Was Showering in Manchester, 2016 — Best Short Film at the 2016 Odesa International Film Festival.

TV 
Kings of the Chambers (2019)

Web series 
Sex, insta and ZNO (2020)

Feature-length 

 My Thoughts Are Silent (2019) — East of West Award at the 2019 Karlovy Vary International Film Festival, Discovery Award at Raindance Film Festival
 Luxembourg, Luxembourg (2022)

Awards

2020 - National Film Award of Ukraine "Golden Dzyga:"
for best film
for the best screenplay - Antonio Lukic and Valeria Kalchenko
Opening of the Year Award
2020 - Ukrainian Pravda Award - Artist of the Year

See also
My Thoughts Are Silent

References

Living people
1992 births
People from Uzhhorod
Ukrainian film directors